Candidacy is a rite which takes place during Roman Catholic seminary formation, by which the Church recognizes the seminarian as worthy of being ordained (hence, they become a "candidate" for ordination to the priesthood). With the liturgical reforms of Pope Paul VI this rite took the place of Tonsure. Permanent deacons in the Roman Catholic Church also go through Candidacy or being recognized as worthy of being ordained just before their ordination as permanent deacons.

See also
List of Roman Catholic seminaries
List of Eastern Catholic seminaries